Boy with Apple is a 21st-century painting by British artist Michael Taylor. Painted on commission for use as a prop in Wes Anderson's 2014 film, The Grand Budapest Hotel, the fictional backstory written for Boy with Apple played a major role in the film's plot.

The portrait depicts a boy clad in Renaissance-style garb holding (pinching with one hand and squeezing hard with the other) a green apple. The model for the portrait was actor Ed Munro.

History 
British artist Michael Taylor painted Boy with Apple in 2012 for use in the then-upcoming film The Grand Budapest Hotel. Taylor was contacted by director Wes Anderson, who requested a faux Renaissance-era portrait that would evoke imagery from European art history. Anderson actively added his own input to the work; specifically, he asked that the painting be made along the lines of works by Hans Holbein the Younger and Elder, Bronzino, Lucas Cranach the Elder, and a number of Flemish and Dutch painters.

A similar amount of detail was given to the painting's backstory. In the film, the painting is attributed to the fictional "Johannes Van Hoytl the Younger" and is described as being of the "Czech mannerist, Habsburg high Renaissance, Budapest neo-humanist" style. Due to the painting's role as a film prop, which required that Boy with Apple be carryable under an actor's arm, Taylor was forced to work on a smaller canvas than he was used to.

Upon the release of The Grand Budapest Hotel, the painting was well received. Art critic Jonathan Jones of The Guardian wrote a full-length analysis of the portrait, stating "Boy with Apple really is priceless, as an art history in-joke."

References

2012 paintings
2012 in art
British paintings